Aleš Šmon (born 20 January 1982) is a Slovenian footballer playing for NK Rudar Velenje as a midfielder.

External links
Profile at Prvaliga.si 

1982 births
Living people
NK Rudar Velenje players
Slovenian footballers
Place of birth missing (living people)
Association football midfielders